Manne is a surname used in Dutch, Yiddish, and Telugu. Notable people with the surname include:

Anne Manne, Australian journalist, wife of Robert Manne
Criminal Manne, American rapper
Henry Manne, American academic in the field of law and economics
Kate Manne, American philosopher
Mordechai Tzvi Manne (1859–1886), Hebrew poet
Robert Manne (born 1947), Australian professor of politics at La Trobe University, Melbourne
Shelly Manne (1920–1984), American jazz drummer

See also
Mann (disambiguation)

References